Dato' Dr. Mohamad Shahrum Osman (born 15 July 1953) was the Member of the Parliament of Malaysia for the Lipis constituency in Pahang from 2004 to 2013. He sat in Parliament as a member of the United Malays National Organisation (UMNO) party in the Barisan Nasional government and also served as the Chairman of the National Higher Education Fund Corporation (PTPTN).

Election results

Honours
 :
 Knight Companion of the Order of the Crown of Pahang (DIMP) - Dato' (2006)

References

Living people
1953 births
People from Pahang
Members of the Dewan Rakyat
Former United Malays National Organisation politicians
Malaysian United Indigenous Party politicians
Malaysian people of Malay descent
Malaysian Muslims